Richard Phillips (born May 16, 1955) is an American merchant mariner and author who served as captain of the MV Maersk Alabama during its hijacking by Somali pirates in April 2009.

Early life and education
Of Irish descent, Phillips was born in Massachusetts, and graduated from Winchester High School in 1973. Phillips enrolled at the University of Massachusetts Amherst and planned to study international law but transferred to the Massachusetts Maritime Academy, from which he graduated in 1979. During his schooling, Phillips worked as a taxi driver in Boston.

Career

Maersk Alabama hijacking

With a crew of 20, the ship had departed from Salalah, Oman en route to Mombasa, Kenya. The ship was carrying 17,000 metric tons of cargo, of which 5,000 metric tons were relief supplies bound for Kenya, Somalia, and Uganda. "In that area of the world, any blip on your radar is of concern," said Phillips, "I always told my crew it was a matter of when, not if."

According to Chief Engineer Mike Perry, the crew sank the pirate speedboat shortly after the boarding by continuously swinging the rudder of the Maersk Alabama, thus swamping the smaller boat. As the pirates were boarding the ship, the crew members locked themselves in the engine room. The crew later overpowered one of the pirates. The crew attempted to exchange the captured pirate, whom they had kept tied up for twelve hours, for Phillips. According to a crew member, Phillips and the pirates got into the ship's rescue boat, but it would not start, so the crew dropped a lifeboat and met the pirates to switch prisoners and boats. The captured pirate was released, but the pirates left with Phillips in the lifeboat before the crew could take action. The lifeboat was carrying ten days of food rations, water, and basic survival supplies.

On April 8, the destroyer  and the frigate  were dispatched to the Gulf of Aden in response to the hostage situation, and reached Maersk Alabama early on April 9. Maersk Alabama then departed from the area with an armed escort, towards its original destination of the port of Mombasa. On Saturday, April 11, Maersk Alabama arrived in Mombasa, still under U.S. military escort. Captain Larry Aasheim then assumed command. Aasheim had previously been captain of the Maersk Alabama until Richard Phillips relieved him eight days prior to the pirate attack. An 18-man marine security team was on board. The U.S. Federal Bureau of Investigation secured the ship as a crime scene.

On April 9, a standoff began between the Bainbridge and the pirates in the Maersk Alabama lifeboat, where they continued to hold Phillips hostage. Three days later, on Sunday, April 12, U.S. Navy marksmen from DEVGRU (commonly known as SEAL Team Six) opened fire and killed the three pirates on the lifeboat, and Phillips was rescued.  The Bainbridge captain Commander Frank Castellano ordered the action after determining that Phillips' life was in immediate danger, based on reports that a pirate was pointing an AK-47 automatic rifle at his back. Navy SEAL snipers on Bainbridge'''s fantail opened fire, killing the three pirates with bullets to the head; one of the pirates was named Ali Aden Elmi, another's last name was Hamac, and the third remains unidentified. A fourth pirate, Abduwali Muse, aboard the Bainbridge and speaking with military negotiators while being treated for an injury sustained in the takeover of Maersk Alabama, surrendered and was taken into custody.  He later pleaded guilty to hijacking, kidnapping and hostage-taking charges and was sentenced to over 33 years in federal prison.

Aftermath

Following the hijacking, Phillips published A Captain's Duty: Somali Pirates, Navy SEALS, and Dangerous Days at Sea. Columbia Pictures optioned the book and acquired the film rights in spring 2010. In March 2011, it was announced that Tom Hanks would star as Phillips, Barkhad Abdi as Abduwali Muse and Faysal Ahmed as Najee in a Sony Pictures film based on the hijacking and Phillips' book, scripted by Billy Ray, and produced by the team behind The Social Network.

The film, titled Captain Phillips, was released on October 11, 2013 and had its premiere showing at the 2013 New York Film Festival.

In an interview on the set of Captain Phillips for New York Daily News, Phillips describes his devotion to his crew, his feeling of success as a captain and his eagerness to get back to sea. "My crew were now safe, because the pirates lost their ladder and boat when they boarded the Maersk Alabama, so they couldn't get back onboard," says Phillips. "For me it was really a relief—my crew and ship were safe." Phillips also added, "I never lost hope for myself, but I didn't see a good ending coming out of it." Phillips commented in his interview that the rendition of the events is accurate, adding, "When I met [Tom Hanks], I told him if he's going to play me, he's going to have to put on a little weight and get a little better-looking and he did neither."

Since the release of Captain Phillips, there has been controversy over its portrayal of Phillips, with several crew members claiming that he was not the hero presented in the film, according to lawsuits filed by more than half of the crew of the Maersk Alabama. The crew members claim Phillips was at least partly at fault for an "insistence on being fast and making money ... [getting] the Alabama within 250 miles of the Somali coast..."Reference to Capt. Phillips, "Major News Stories That Forgot To Tell You Best Part", cracked.com; accessed April 8, 2015.

Phillips told CNN's Drew Griffin in 2010 and in a court deposition in 2013 that he ignored the numerous warnings that urged him to go farther out to sea. When asked in 2013 why he decided not to take the ship farther offshore, Phillips testified, "I don't believe 600 miles would make you safe. I didn't believe 1,200 miles would make you safe. As I told the crew, it would be a matter of when, not if ... We were always in this area."

Phillips returned to sea fourteen months after the pirate attack, sailing as Master of the vehicle carrier M/V Green Bay'' until his retirement was announced by the International Organization of Masters, Mates and Pilots in October 2014.

Bibliography

References

External links

1955 births
American people of Irish descent
Living people
Massachusetts Maritime Academy alumni
Sea captains
People captured by pirates
American taxi drivers
People from Winchester, Massachusetts
Winchester High School (Massachusetts) alumni
Writers from Massachusetts